The 2016 NRL Under-20s season (known commercially as the 2016 Holden Cup due to sponsorship from Holden) was the ninth season of the National Rugby League's Under-20s competition. The draw and structure of the competition mirrored that of the NRL's 2016 Telstra Premiership season.

Season summary

Schedule

NYC Records

Ladder

Ladder Progression
Numbers highlighted in green indicate that the team finished the round inside the top 8.

Finals Series

† Match decided in extra time.

Grand final

References